Soltera otra vez (Single Again) is a Chilean telenovela produced and broadcast by Canal 13. The story follows Cristina Moreno and her adventures to find love.

Its first episode was released on 27 May 2012. After an initial and only first season, a follow-up season was announced by its director Herval Abreu. The second season was released on 21 July 2013. The third season was released on 5 March 2018.

Cast 
 Paz Bascuñán as Cristina "Cristi" Moreno
 Cristián Arriagada as Rodrigo "Monito" González
 Josefina Montané as Nicole Cerutti "La Flexible"
 Pablo Macaya as Álvaro Vergara
 Loreto Aravena as Susana "Susy" Sánchez
 Nicolás Poblete as Zamir "Turco" Célis
 Lorena Bosch as Mirna Fabiola"negra" Meneses
 Héctor Morales as Aliro Moreno
 Aranzazú Yankovic as Camila Montes
 Ignacio Garmendia as Rafael Campos
 Catalina Guerra as Milena Simunovic
 Luis Gnecco as Sergio "Pelao" Monroy
 Solange Lackington as Luisa Tapia
 Julio González as Waldo López
 Juanita Ringeling as Martina Ivanov
 Álvaro Gómez as León Fernández
 Constanza Rojas as Pascuala Vergara
 Antonella Orsini as Úrsula Garagaytia
 Maricarmen Arrigorriaga as Rebeca Riesling
 Roderick Teerink as Sven

Special participations
 Elisa Zulueta as Marjorie Delgado (season 1)
 Andrés Gormaz as "Jamaica" (season 1)

Guests 
Season 1

 Paulo Brunetti - Gustavo
 Daniel Alcaíno - Bernardo
 Eusebio Arenas - Denis
 Osvaldo Silva - Cristóbal Cerutti
 Fernando Kliche - Rudy
 Gonzalo Valenzuela - Santiago Schmidt
 Guido Vecchiola - Tomás Echeverría
 Ariel Levy - Exequiel Echeverría
 Elvira Cristi - Loretta
 Juan Pablo Sáez - Renato
 Nicolás Fontaine - Mario
 José Martínez - Pablo
 Eyal Meyer - Víctor
 Pablo Casals - Flavio
 Santiago Tupper - Raimundo Soto
 Catherine Mazoyer - Marcia
 Sebastián Dahm - Pedro
 Alessandra Guerzoni - Pamela Middleton
 Patricio Strahovsky - Rudy's friend
 Andrea Zuckermann - Denis' mother
 Coca Rudolphy - Sra. Tita
 Lisette Lastra - Amiga
 Alejandro Trejo - Dr. Vasconcellos
 Teresa Münchmeyer - Margarita
 Fedra Vergara
 Gonzalo Ducheylard - Peter
 Nicolás Soto - Ignacio

Season 2

 Berta Lasala - Vannesa Castillo
 Francesca Ratto - Javiera
 Álvaro Viguera - Alan
 Consuelo Holzapfel - Eliana 
 Silvia Santelices - Nelly
 Felipe Armas
 Mabel Farías - Pilar
 Carolina Stone - Pamela
 Carolina López - Ingrid
 Constanza Rojas - Pascuala Vergara
 Emilio Sutherland - himself

References

External links 
 
 Official website 

2012 telenovelas
Chilean telenovelas
2012 Chilean television series debuts
2018 Chilean television series endings
Canal 13 (Chilean TV channel) telenovelas
Spanish-language telenovelas